The 5.56×21mm PINDAD was a personal defence weapon round previously developed in Indonesia. The round is based on the 5.56×45mm NATO cartridge, being a cut down version of it.

Development
The 5.56x21mm round is said to have the same firepower from a .40 S&W or 10mm round.

Platforms using this cartridge
 Pindad PS-01

References

Pistol and rifle cartridges
5.56 mm firearms